Richard Felicié Bella (born 3 April 1967) is a Central African former professional basketball player. He competed at the 1988 Summer Olympics with the Central African Republic national basketball team.

Bella played college basketball in Canada for the St. Francis Xavier X-Men. He played for Francorosso Torino of the Italian Serie A2 Basket during the 1993–94 season. Bella played for the start of the 1994–95 season with Libertas Udine of the same league.

References

1967 births
Living people
People from Ombella-M'Poko
Auxilium Pallacanestro Torino players
Basketball players at the 1988 Summer Olympics
Centers (basketball)
Central African Republic men's basketball players
Olympic basketball players of the Central African Republic
St. Francis Xavier University alumni
Central African Republic expatriate sportspeople in Canada
Central African Republic expatriate sportspeople in Italy